Abdul Naseri (born 9 September 1994) is an Afghan cricketer. He made his first-class debut for Band-e-Amir Region in the 2017–18 Ahmad Shah Abdali 4-day Tournament on 29 April 2018. He made his List A debut on 18 October 2021, for Speen Ghar Region in the 2021 Ghazi Amanullah Khan Regional One Day Tournament.

References

External links
 

1994 births
Living people
Afghan cricketers
Band-e-Amir Dragons cricketers
Spin Ghar Tigers cricketers
Place of birth missing (living people)